The Wasps is incidental music composed by the British composer Ralph Vaughan Williams in 1909. It was written for the Cambridge Greek Play production of Aristophanes' The Wasps at Trinity College, Cambridge, and was Vaughan Williams' first of only three forays into incidental music. A later performance of the work was one of only a small number of performances conducted by Vaughan Williams that was committed to a recording.

It was scored for baritone solo voices, a chorus of tenors and baritones (in two parts each), and orchestra. The complete incidental music is lengthy (about 1 hour and 45 minutes) and is not often performed.

Vaughan Williams later arranged parts of the music into an orchestral suite (about 26 minutes), in five parts:
 Overture
 Entr'acte
 March Past of the Kitchen Utensils
 Entr'acte
 Ballet and Final Tableau.

The Overture is quite concise (about 10 minutes) and is a popular independent concert piece today. The main theme is pentatonic. There are close to 30 recordings now available of the overture. The March Past of the Kitchen Utensils is sometimes separately performed.  The entire orchestral suite is also sometimes performed and recorded.

The year before he wrote The Wasps, Vaughan Williams spent three months in Paris studying  with Maurice Ravel, whose influence is apparent in the middle section. Although The Wasps may reflect something of Ravel, the outer sections are quintessential Vaughan Williams. Except for the opening buzzing, the piece has little to do with wasps or with ancient Greece.

References

External links
Vaughan Williams (1872-1958) - Overture: The Wasps, concise essay on MusicWeb International
First complete recording of The Wasps, reviewed by MusicWeb International (Hallé HLD7510)
List of Works - plays, radio and film, notations by the Ralph Vaughan Williams Society 
Video - Vaughan Williams - The Wasps (Orchestral Suite) (26:01).
Video - Vaughan Williams - The Wasps (Complete) (105:29).

1909 compositions
Compositions by Ralph Vaughan Williams
Orchestral suites
Incidental music
Adaptations of works by Aristophanes